Dario Argento (born 7 September 1940) is an Italian film director, producer, screenwriter, actor and critic. His influential work in the horror genre during the 1970s and 1980s, particularly in the subgenre known as giallo, has led him to being referred to as the "Master of the Thrill" and the "Master of Horror".

His films as director include his "Animal Trilogy", consisting of The Bird with the Crystal Plumage (1970), The Cat o' Nine Tails (1971) and Four Flies on Grey Velvet (1971); his "Three Mothers" trilogy, consisting of Suspiria (1977), Inferno (1980) and The Mother of Tears (2007); and his stand-alone films Deep Red (1975), Tenebrae (1982), Phenomena (1985) and Opera (1987). He co-wrote the screenplay for Sergio Leone's Once Upon a Time in the West (1968) and served as George A. Romero's script consultant on Dawn of the Dead (1978), for which he also composed the soundtrack with his long-time collaborators Goblin.

Early life 

Argento was born in Rome, the son of a Sicilian film producer and executive Salvatore Argento (1914–1987) and a Brazilian photographer Elda Luxardo (1915–2013), who was of Italian ancestry. While still attending a Catholic secondary school as a teenager, Argento began working as a film critic, writing for magazines and as a columnist for the Rome-based newspaper Paese Sera While working at the newspaper, Argento also began working as a screenwriter. His most notable works were for Sergio Leone, Bernardo Bertolucci and his collaboration on the story for the Sergio Leone Spaghetti Western Once Upon a Time in the West in 1968.

Career

1970s

Argento began work on his directorial debut, the giallo film The Bird with the Crystal Plumage (L'uccello dalle piume di cristallo, 1970), which was a major hit in Italy. Argento continued to concentrate largely on the giallo genre, directing two more successful thrillers, The Cat o' Nine Tails (Il gatto a nove code, 1971) and Four Flies on Grey Velvet (4 mosche di velluto grigio, 1972). Along with The Bird with the Crystal Plumage, these three films are frequently referred to as Argento's "Animal Trilogy". The director then turned his attention away from giallo movies, filming two Italian TV dramas and a period comedy, The Five Days (Le cinque giornate, 1973). Argento returned to thrillers with Deep Red (1975), frequently cited by many critics as the best giallo ever made. The film made Argento known internationally and inspired other directors to work in the genre. John Carpenter has frequently referred to the influence Argento's early work had on Halloween (1978).

Argento's next film was Suspiria (1977), a supernatural horror. Argento planned for Suspiria to be the first of a trilogy about "The Three Mothers", three ancient witches residing in three different modern cities. The second film of the trilogy was 1980's Inferno. The Mother of Tears (2007) concluded the trilogy.

In 1978, Argento collaborated with George A. Romero on Dawn of the Dead, earning a producer credit and also providing soundtrack work for the zombie film. Argento oversaw the European release of the film, where it was titled Zombi, which was much shorter and featured more of the score written and performed by Goblin.

1980s
 
After Inferno, Argento returned to the more conventional giallo style with Tenebrae (1982). He then attempted to combine giallo and supernatural fantasy in 1985's Phenomena, also known as Creepers, which was one of Jennifer Connelly's earliest movies. Phenomena also showed Argento's predilection for using new technology, as evidenced by the film's several prowling Steadicam shots. Both films received a lukewarm reception upon their release (although each has been positively reappraised since).

Argento subsequently took a break from directing to write two screenplays for Mario Bava's son, Lamberto Bava: Dèmoni (1985) and Dèmoni 2 (1986).

Opera followed in 1987. Set in Parma's Regio Theatre during a production of Verdi's Macbeth, the production was beset by real-life misfortunes that Argento suspected were caused by the supposed traditional "curse" on the Shakespearean play. Argento's father died during its production, Vanessa Redgrave quit the project before filming began, he had problems working with his former long-time girlfriend and collaborator Daria Nicolodi on-set, and the cast and crew were plagued by several minor accidents and mishaps.

In 1987–88, Argento produced a TV series called Turno di Notte, which had 15 episodes. Nine of the shows were directed by Luigi Cozzi, the other six by Lamberto Bava. Daria Nicolodi and Asia Argento starred in several of the episodes.

Argento later produced and wrote the screenplays for two horror films directed by Michele Soavi, The Church (1989) and The Sect (1991).

1990s

In 1990, Argento co-directed Two Evil Eyes with George Romero, a two-story anthology film inspired by the works of Edgar Allan Poe.

In 1992, Argento filmed Trauma, starring his daughter Asia Argento, in Minneapolis, MN. It is largely a traditional giallo, but in an American setting. Like many of Argento's films, it contains an optical illusion witnessed by a character stumbling upon a murder, but he or she, like the audience, misinterprets the nature of the crime. This cinematic sleight-of-hand is one of Argento's recurring motifs.

His 1996 film The Stendhal Syndrome, in which a policewoman (played by Argento's daughter, Asia) who suffers from Stendhal syndrome is trapped by a serial killer in an abandoned warehouse, was the first Italian film to use computer-generated imagery.  Moreover, the film's opening scene was shot in Florence at Italy's famed Uffizi Gallery. Argento is the only director ever granted permission to shoot there. The Stendhal Syndrome was distributed in the U.S. by cult B-movie distribution company Troma Entertainment.

In the early 1990s, Argento was interested in collaborating with Italian director Lucio Fulci on a horror film. Due to financial setbacks, the project was repeatedly postponed. In 1996, Argento was able to gather the funding, but was unable at that point to collaborate with Fulci who died in March of that year. The film was later directed by Sergio Stivaletti as Wax Mask, with Argento and Fulci both receiving co-screenwriting credits.

Argento later directed 1998's The Phantom of the Opera and 2001's Sleepless.

2000s and 2010s
In 2004, Argento directs The Card Player, a giallo about a killer whose murders are conducted during Internet poker matches with the Rome police, earned a mixed reception; some fans appreciated the techno music score composed by ex-Goblin member Claudio Simonetti, but felt the film was too mainstream, with little of Argento's usual flourish.

In the 2005 TV broadcast of Argento's Do You Like Hitchcock?,  the director paid homage to Alfred Hitchcock after decades of being compared to him by critics. Later that year, he directed an episode of Masters of Horror, a Showtime television series, called "Jenifer". For season two of the series, Argento directed "Pelts", an adaption of the F. Paul Wilson short story of the same name.

In 2007, Argento finished the final film of his Three Mothers trilogy, The Mother of Tears, which is set in Rome and centers on the titular "third mother", Mater Lacrimarum. Argento and Jace Anderson share writing credits for the film. Asia Argento was cast as the lead player, along with her mother and frequent Argento collaborator Daria Nicolodi in a supporting role. Udo Kier, who appeared in Argento's Suspiria, and Coralina Cataldi-Tassoni, who appeared in three of his previous films, both have pivotal roles in the final Mothers chapter.

On 26 June 2009, Giallo premiered at the Edinburgh Film Festival. The following month, he announced that he had started working on a 3D remake of Deep Red, but subsequently this project was shelved due to the commercial failure of Giallo in Italian cinemas. He then announced his decision to write a new screenplay . On 4 March 2011, it was announced that Rutger Hauer had signed on to play Van Helsing in Argento's Dracula 3D, which began shooting in Budapest later in the year. It was released on 19 May 2012 to generally negative reviews.

2020s 
In 2021, Argento returned to acting and portrayed Lui in Gaspar Noe's 2021 psychological drama film Vortex. The film screened in the Premiere section at the 2021 Cannes Film Festival to critical acclaim for his performance.

In 2022, Argento directs Dark Glasses, in his first directorial work since the 2012 film Dracula 3D.

Unrelated projects
In 2014, Argento was slated to direct The Sandman, which had Iggy Pop attached to star and a script by David Tully. The film successfully raised over $195,000 from over 1,000 backers on Indiegogo in December 2014. However, filming has not commenced as of 2019, and the project producers have not updated the film's status to backers since August 2017.

Italian director Luca Guadagnino helmed Suspiria (2018), a remake of Argento's 1977 film. The American screenplay is based on the original script Argento wrote with Daria Nicolodi, his former long-term partner.

In 2019, Argento announced that he was developing a female-led serial movie, consisting of eight episodes, for a streaming service.

Other work 

He is involved in operating a horror memorabilia store located at Via dei Gracchi 260 in Rome named Profondo Rosso, after his classic film Deep Red. In the cellar is a collection of his movies. The store is managed by his long-time collaborator and friend Luigi Cozzi.

He has contributed in the development of the survival horror video game Dead Space, and also in the dubbing of the Dr. Kyne character in the Italian version of the game.

He is acting as an artistic director on Clod Studio's upcoming video game Dreadful Bond.

Personal life 

Between 1968 and 1972, Argento was married to Marisa Casale, the great-granddaughter of Italian composer, pianist and conductor Alfredo Casella. Argento and Casale had one child, actress and costume designer Fiore Argento (born in 1970).

Argento had a professional and romantic relationship with Italian actress and screenwriter Daria Nicolodi; they met in 1974 during casting for Deep Red, and their daughter Asia Argento was born in 1975. Nicolodi co-wrote Argento's Suspiria (1977) and appeared in Argento's Deep Red (1975), Inferno (1980), Tenebrae (1982), Phenomena (1985), Opera (1987), and The Mother of Tears (2007). Argento and Nicolodi separated in 1985.

An actress and director, Asia Argento's earliest screen appearances includes roles in her father's productions Demons 2 (1986) and The Church (1989) before being directed by her father in the films Trauma (1993), The Stendahl Syndrome (1996), The Phantom of the Opera (1998), The Mother of Tears (2007), and Dracula 3D (2012).

Works and criticism

Maitland McDonagh wrote about Argento in her book Broken Mirrors/Broken Minds: The Dark Dreams of Dario Argento (1991). Argento is also the subject of Art of Darkness, a collection of critical essays, reviews, promotional stills, and poster art edited by Chris Gallant. British journalist Alan Jones published Profondo Argento, a compendium of set reports, interviews, and biographical detail. English sound designer, writer, and musician Heather Emmett published Sounds to Die For: Speaking the Language of Horror Film Sound, which includes the first in-depth study of the use of sound in Argento's films.

In 2012, Argento was highlighted in the retrospective Argento: Il Cinema Nel Sangue at the Museum of Arts and Design in New York City.  The retrospective celebrated the influence of the Argento family on filmmaking in Italy and around the world. It highlighted Dario's contribution, as well as that of his father (Salvatore), brother (Claudio), ex-wife (Daria Nicolodi) and daughter (Asia).

Critical decline 
With the exceptions of The Stendhal Syndrome and Sleepless, all of Argento's films since the "golden age" of the 1970s and 1980s have been generally poorly received by critics and fans alike, including Argento scholars such as Maitland McDonagh. Fangoria wrote in 2010, "over the last decade, standards have slipped. For a filmmaker who was always so precise in his construction and cutting, his later films such as The Phantom of the Opera and The Card Player are sloppy, stitched together so carelessly that they leak vital fluid. Gradually, the kaleidoscopic style that once characterized his films has slowly blanched away."

Filmography

Film

Acting roles

Television

Acting roles

Awards
Life time achievement award
 2019 –   David of Donatello
 2021 –  Lifetime Achievement Award at 74th Locarno Film Festival, Switzerland

References

Further reading

 Xavier Mendik. "From the Monstrous Mother to the 'Third' Sex:  Female Abjection in the Films of Dario Argento" in Andy Black (ed), Necronomicon: The Journal of Horror and Erotic Cinema: Book Two, London: creation Books, 1998, pp. 110–133.
 "Fear: The Autobiography", October 2019, by Dario Argento. Fab Press Limited, .

External links 

 

 
1940 births
Giallo film directors
Horror film directors
Italian people of Brazilian descent
Living people
People of Sicilian descent
Film directors from Rome
Italian film directors